Pine is a small unincorporated community in western Ripley County, Missouri, United States. It is located on a county road in the Mark Twain National Forest, approximately sixteen miles northwest of Doniphan.

A post office called Pine was established in 1883, and remained in operation until the 1970s. The community was so named on account of pine trees near the original town site.

References

Unincorporated communities in Ripley County, Missouri
Unincorporated communities in Missouri